USS DuPage, a self propelled barracks ship was laid down on December 9, 1942, as the Liberty ship S.S. John W. Weeks, and launched on January 2, 1943.  It was delivered to the War Shipping Administration for operation under contract to the U.S. Army Transportation Service. In 1951 the ship was acquired by the U.S. Navy and placed in service as the USS DuPage (APB–51).  Later it was placed out of service (date unknown) and returned to the Maritime Administration for disposal. The ship was scrapped in 1959.

Awards
National Defense Service Medal

References 

 NavSource, APB-51

 

Barracks ships of the United States Navy
DuPage County, Illinois
1943 ships